MacFarquhar is a surname, and may refer to:

 Colin Macfarquhar
 Larissa MacFarquhar, American writer
 Neil MacFarquhar
 Roderick MacFarquhar, China specialist

See also

 Farquhar

Surnames